Pirkis is a surname. Notable people with the surname include:

 Catherine Louisa Pirkis (1841–1910), English author and animal welfare worker
 Max Pirkis (born 1989), English actor

See also
 Beca Lyne-Pirkis (born 1981), Welsh cook, food writer, and TV presenter
 Piris